Sapphire Styx is a fictional character appearing in American comic books published by Marvel Comics.

Fictional character biography
At the Princess' Bar on Madripoor, Sapphire Styx is first seen witnessing Wolverine defeating Roche's gang. She posed as a hostage where her tormentor is scared away by Wolverine. Before she can kiss him, Wolverine mentioned the name Dave Chapel causing her to pull out a gun like everyone else in the Princess' Bar. After putting away her gun alongside everyone else, Sapphire Styx began to bother Wolverine until he left the Princess Bar. Upon finding Wolverine lying on the street, Sapphire Styx offered him her place to stay for the night. When Wolverine wasn't up to it, she gave him a kiss enough to drain his lifeforce and even continued to drain it after he was attacked by Razor Fist. After Wolverine woke up, Sapphire Styx arrived and drained his lifeforce again. She mentioned that she liked his primal essence and apologizes that she'll have to leave him at Roche's mercy. Sapphire got bored with Roche's group torturing Wolverine and later left with them when Wolverine fell unconscious. Wolverine had a nightmare of running into Sapphire Styx and Roche's men.

Sapphire Styx watched Roche torture O'Donnell and was annoyed when Razor Fist got all the fun. Roche sent Sapphire Styx after O'Donnell where she started to drain his lifeforce until she got shot by Tyger Tyger. After defeating the Inquisitor, Tyger Tyger fought Sapphire Styx where she threw her around and started to drain her lifeforce. Tyger Tyger broke free and used the Inquisitor's heating iron to burn Sapphire's face. Tyger Tyger then collapsed while Sapphire Styx fled from Roche's estate alongside the Inquisitor.

Sapphire Styx later started causing trouble again where she stole a box from Tyger Tyger. When called in to pursue Sapphire Styx, Wolverine pursued Sapphire to Madripoor's harbor. Sapphire tried to seduce Wolverine only for him to resist and beat her up. Hearing about Sapphire's defeat, Tyger Tyger planned to make arrangements for her.

During the "Hunt for Wolverine" storyline, Sapphire Styx is among the villains with Viper that attack Kitty Pryde's group as the latest member of the Femme Fatales. She crashed Psylocke's battle with Mindblast where she started draining Psylocke's lifeforce. Viper later talks with a representative of her client as she mentions that Sapphire Styx is still draining off of Psylocke just like she did with Magneto ever since the client gave Sapphire to her. The representative tells Viper that Sapphire Styx tends to prefer the life force of the mutants and tells Viper to focus on delivering the package as all that they are serves the will of Soteira. As Snake Whip asks if they are going to ignore Sapphire Styx' vampiric appetite, Viper says that they have to obey the representative's orders and "let the @#$%& feed." Meanwhile, Sapphire Styx still has Psylocke in her possession as she states that Psylocke's soul is magnificent as it could keep her revitalized for years only to sense that she is dead. As Storm's claustrophobia brings a rainstorm to Madripoor, Sapphire Styx comments that she hasn't felt rain that primal for decades. As Sapphire gloats to Psylocke that she died to soon, she is surprised to see what appears to be Wolverine in his Patch alias sitting near Psylocke as he plans to dish out the proper punishment on her. Viper and Snake Whip check up on Sapphire Styx who claims that she can see Wolverine's Patch alias even though she is the only one who can see him. Kitty Pryde, Domino, and Jubilee catch up to Sapphire and Kitty figures out that Psylocke is playing a mind trick on her. Psylocke's voice is heard quoting "NO MORE SOULS" as Sapphire's body begins to shatter. Inside Sapphire Styx's body, Psylocke's soul sliver fights past the other souls where she finds a soul sliver of Wolverine. With help from Wolverine's soul sliver, Sapphire was overpowered from within and shatters. Her remaining soul power enabled Psylocke to create a new body for herself.

Powers and abilities
Sapphire Styx can drain the lifeforce out of anyone she comes in contact with. The more lifeforce she absorbs, the stronger she gets.

Sapphire Styx is also an expert at armed combat, but rarely uses a gun in battle.

References

External links
 Sapphire Styx at Marvel Wiki
 

Characters created by Chris Claremont
Characters created by John Buscema
Fictional characters with absorption or parasitic abilities
Fictional mercenaries in comics
Marvel Comics mutants
Marvel Comics supervillains
Marvel Comics female supervillains